Rapid Bus Sdn Bhd is the largest bus operator in Malaysia operating mainly in urban areas of Klang Valley, Penang & Kuantan. As of February 2023, Rapid KL service brands unit of Rapid Bus, has operates 113 normal routes and also 69 MRT Feeder Bus routes, along with 8 Nadiputra routes in Putrajaya. 

Rapid Bus routes were previously operated by Intrakota Komposit Sdn Bhd, a subsidiary of DRB-Hicom Berhad; and Cityliner Sdn Bhd, a subsidiary of Park May Berhad. When it took over, there were 179 routes. Since January 2006, Rapid KL has redrawn the entire network.

Rapid Bus is however not the only bus operator in Kuala Lumpur and the Klang Valley. Other bus operators such as Selangor Omnibus, MARA Liner and Causeway Link also serve the Klang Valley.

History
In October 2003, Prasarana Malaysia Berhad bought over Intrakota Komposit and its subsidiaries from DRB-Hicom for RM177mil. It also paid RM14mil cash for the 364 buses belonging to Cityliner. The original companies were appointed interim operators.

Rapid Bus began the first phase of the revamp of its bus network in January 2006 by introducing 15 City Shuttle bus routes which serve major areas in the central business district of Kuala Lumpur. The buses run between four hubs at the edge of the central business district, namely KL Sentral, Titiwangsa, KLCC and Maluri, and Medan Pasar in the city centre. These bus hubs also serve as rail interchanges, with the exception of Medan Pasar, although it is at a walking distance from Masjid Jamek LRT station.

In March 2006,  Rapid Bus revamped the bus network serving Kepong, Selayang, Gombak, Batu Caves, Bandar Sri Damansara and Bandar Manjalara areas which it called Area 2. The areas are now service by four Trunk Routes and 35 Local Shuttle routes when fully implemented. The four trunk routes all begin from the Titiwangsa hub where passengers can change to City Shuttles. At the other end, the trunk routes serve regional hubs where Local Shuttles fan out into the residential suburbs.

On 30 April 2006, the bus network in Area 3 covering Setapak, Ulu Kelang, Wangsa Maju, Keramat, Ampang and Pandan was revamped. Three trunk bus routes serve this area, one from Titiwangsa and two from KLCC while 26 local shuttle routes complete the network for this area.

On 1 July 2006, two express services, four trunk lines and 32 local services were introduced in Area 4. It covers areas including Cheras, Serdang, Kajang, Balakong, Putrajaya, Cyberjaya and Bandar Baru Bangi.

On 23 September 2006, Rapid Bus' revamp of the Klang Valley's bus network became complete with the introduction of new routes in Area Five which covers Subang Jaya, USJ, Puchong, and Petaling Jaya, Shah Alam and Klang south of the Federal Highway; and Area Six which covers Damansara, Bandar Utama, Kota Damansara and areas of Petaling Jaya, Shah Alam and Klang north of the Federal Highway.

On 21 April 2007, sixteen months after the first step of the first revamp, a second major revamp was undertaken on the entire bus network on grounds of feedback from commuters who wanted the buses to ferry them from their housing estates direct to the city centre, that is with less or without much need to change buses in the middle of their journey.

This revamp saw the routes being adjusted (e.g. B112 [Maluri — KL Sentral], formerly 112, now passes by Jalan Hang Tuah/Pudu/Tun Tan Cheng Lock instead of Jalan Maharajalela/Sultan Sulaiman), extended (T40 [Kajang — Maluri], is now U40 and is extended to Pasar Seni LRT), merged (T41 [Serdang Komuter — Maluri] and 414 [Serdang — Bandar Sungai Long] become U41 [Pasar Seni LRT — Bandar Sungai Long]) or discontinued (route 107 ceased operations on that date).

On 1 December 2015, a third revamp, known as The Bus Network Revamp (BNR) was carried out by SPAD to improve urban public transport in Greater Kuala Lumpur/ Klang Valley. This procedure has caused RapidKL to surrender most of its bus routes to other bus providers such as Causeway Link, Selangor Omnibus, Setara Jaya and Nadi Putra, and also changes to the route numbers.

On 18 June 2020, Rapid Bus released new features on real time locations of bus in Google Maps, via collaboration with Google Transit. Almost 170 RapidKL's bus routes are covered with this real time feature, and were expanded to MRT feeder bus service, Rapid Penang, and Rapid Kuantan.

On 2023, Rapid KL take over the bus service operator from Pengangkutan Awam Putrajaya Travel & Tours Sdn Bhd in Putrajaya.

Services
 Rapid KL, a unit of Rapid Bus currently the largest operator stage bus services in Klang Valley.
 Rapid Penang, a unit of Rapid Bus currently the only one operator in Penang island & largest operator stage bus services in Penang northern state of Malaysia.
 Rapid Kuantan, a unit of Rapid Bus currently the largest stage bus services in Kuantan, Pahang east coast state of Malaysia.
 Rapid Kamunting, the stage bus service at Kamunting & Taiping, Perak, terminated on 15 June 2021.
 Go KL City Bus, one of the operator for free bus service funded by  Land Public Transport Commission (Malaysia) (SPAD), had been transferred to SKS Bus / Causeway Link in 2021.
 PJ City Bus, a free bus service funded by  Petaling Jaya City Council (MBPJ).
 Smart Selangor Bus, a largest free bus service funded by Selangor State Government. Rapid Bus is an operator of Smart Selangor buses for Shah Alam City Council (MBSA) (except routes SA01, SA03, SA04 & SA06 where it were transferred to Unic Leisure Transtour in mid-2022, while SA09 operated by Wawasan Sutera), Klang Municipal Council (MPK) (except KLG02 & KLG04 - these routes were operated by Wawasan Sutera), Subang Jaya City Council (MBSJ), Ampang Jaya Municipal Council (MPAJ), Kajang Municipal Council (MPKj), Selayang Municipal Council (MPS) and Kuala Langat Municipal Council (MPKL).
 MBPP Rapid Penang Free Shuttle for Bridge Express Shuttle Transit (BEST), Central Area Transit (CAT) and Pulau Tikus Loop (PTL) funded by Penang Island City Council (MBPP), only CAT for George Town and CAT Bridge is remained, the others are being terminated.
 Rapid Manjung, a unit of Rapid Bus in Manjung, terminated on 1 November 2020.
 Nadi Putra, a unit of Rapid Bus funded by Putrajaya Corporation, launched in 1 January 2023. It replaced the previous bus operator from Pengangkutan Awam Putrajaya Travel & Tours Sdn Bhd which have been privatized in 2018.

Using Rapid Bus in Rapid KL brands

Nomenclature (Before BNR): 2006–2015
Rapid Bus operates four types of bus services: City Shuttles (Malay: Perkhidmatan bandar), Trunk Buses (Perkhidmatan utama), Local Shuttles (Perkhidmatan tempatan) and point-to-point Express buses (Perkhidmatan ekspres).

City Shuttles have red destination boards, trunk buses have blue boards, local shuttles have green boards and express services have orange boards.

Rapid Bus has also divided up the Klang Valley into six areas:
 Area One : Kuala Lumpur City Centre (Central Business District)
 Area Two : Kepong, Segambut, Selayang, Batu Caves, Gombak, Jalan Ipoh and Sentul
 Area Three : Setapak, Wangsa Maju, Ulu Klang, Setiawangsa, Keramat, Ampang and Pandan
 Area Four : Cheras, Kajang, Ulu Langat, Putrajaya, Cyberjaya, Semenyih, Sungai Besi, Seri Kembangan, Serdang and Balakong
 Area Five : Klang, Shah Alam Selatan, Bandar Sunway, Subang Jaya, Jalan Klang Lama and Puchong
 Area Six : Shah Alam Utara, Subang, Damansara, Petaling Jaya Utara, Bangsar and Kota Damansara

Route numbers for the local shuttle are prefixed by the letter T (for Tempatan), e.g. T323.
Route numbers for the express services are prefixed by the letter E (for Ekspres), e.g. E11A.

There was a prefix for trunk shuttles which is U (for Utama) e.g. U410 and for city shuttles which is B (for Bandar), e.g. B114. Later all the prefix were demolished due to the revamping of the Land Public Transport Commission (SPAD) except the local shuttle T (Tempatan) services.

The Bus Network Revamp (BNR): 2015–present
The Ampang Corridor, Cheras Corridor, Sungai Besi Corridor, Klang Lama Corridor, Lebuhraya Persekutuan Corridor, Damansara Corridor, Jalan Ipoh Corridor, and Jalan Pahang Corridor were revamped under the Bus Network Revamp reorganization.

The Land Public Transport Commission (SPAD) has divided up the Klang Valley into 8 stage bus corridors:
 Jalan Ipoh Corridor
 Jalan Pahang Corridor
 Ampang Corridor
 Cheras Corridor
 Sungai Besi Corridor
 Klang Lama Corridor
 Lebuhraya Persekutuan Corridor
 Damansara Corridor

The Bus Network Revamp has been implemented by Land Public Transport Commission (SPAD) as of 1 December 2015.

Bus routes

Former bus routes served by Rapid Bus 
Before the implementation of the Bus Network Revamp (BNR) by the Land Public Transport Commission (SPAD), these are the former routes being served by Rapid Bus.

Using the service
Rapid Bus new bus system expects users to hop on more than one bus to complete a journey. This is unlike the previous Rapid Bus bus system and that still in use by other bus operators in the Klang Valley, where most bus services begin in the suburbs, follow a trunk route to the city, then perform a sweep in the city centre before terminating.

Instead, Rapid Bus users are expected to use a combination of its four types of services to complete journeys. Local Shuttles take users in the suburbs to hubs, usually bus terminals or LRT stations, where users transfer to LRTs or trunk buses to continue their journeys to the city or elsewhere in the Klang Valley. The city centre is served exclusively by GoKL City Bus.

Fares
Effective 1 September 2009, all Rapid Bus buses will be issued a single journey tickets for their city shuttle (BANDAR), local shuttle (TEMPATAN) & express (EKSPRES) bus routes which replaced the daily unlimited ride tickets. As for trunk shuttle (UTAMA) bus route, the tickets will be issued based on the number of zones covered. For example, if a person travels across three zones on the trunk shuttle (UTAMA) bus route, the bus fare is RM 2.50 for single journey. The ticket must be kept while on board for inspection by RapidKL officials failure of which the ticket must be purchased again if the ticket is lost while on board during the inspection.

Spouse and a total of 4 youngsters under 15 years old are allowed to accompany the pass holder free on weekends and public holidays.

Effective 10 April 2019, all RapidKL buses is implementing full cashless journey for all routes by stages, in which the bus only accepts Touch n Go card only for user convenience. The systems were fully implemented by 27 May 2019.

The fares for each zone per single journey is as follows

Unlimited journey monthly-pass were also available for Malaysian-citizens, at RM30 per month.

Schedules
Detailed schedules of bus services are not published, although headway information and operating hours is publicly available.

Headway:
 City Shuttle: 10 to 20 minutes
 Trunk Line (UTAMA): 15 to 30 minutes
 Local Shuttle (TEMPATAN): 30 to 75 minutes

There are scheduled services that are not subject to the above headways.

RapidBET – Rapid Bus Express Transit 
In 2010, SPAD introduced the express transit system in Klang Valley, namely BET, where the buses utilize less congested highways to link between heavily populated areas and city centers in Kuala Lumpur, Putrajaya and Penang. Naturally, by using the highways, travel time is reduced as the highways are less congested than the normal routes. The service will have limited stops and rely on feeder buses and park-n-ride facilities to ensure sufficient ridership. With BET, travel time is expected to be reduced by up to 50 percent on certain BETs.

There were only 3 BET services operated by RapidKL and 1 express service in RapidPenang. Except for RapidPenang, these services are only available on weekdays and during the morning and evening rush hours only. For this initial introductory stage, BET will run at 15 minute intervals during the morning and evening peak hours. Frequency and service periods will be increased at a later stage depending on the demand for each route.

Buses for BET routes are about two to five buses initially and will be reviewed from time to time as the demand grows. BET is more of an enhancement to the current services, whereby the focus is more to shorten the travel time. Fare for single journey on RapidKL is RM3 for adults and RM1.50 for concession, at flat rate.

Kuala Lumpur district area 

The only remaining BET inside Kuala Lumpur district area is the BET7, from Sri Nilam at Bandar Baru Ampang, parallel to 300 service until LRT Ampang, then bypass through Ampang-Kuala Lumpur Elevated Highway (AKLEH) until Jalan Tun Razak interchange, then re-merge on 300 at Ampang Park LRT station before terminating at Munshi Abullah bus hub. This route is the most heavily used than any other BET's, and the bus only runs on morning rush hour, 4 trips daily. The fleet used is the Alexander Dennis Enviro500 and Volvo B8L double-decker bus.

As of May 2021, the service has been suspended due to Malaysia's total lockdown and the continuation of this service is yet to be unknown.

To Putrajaya 

Two BET services serve the Putrajaya Presint 2 central district for government employees between Selayang, Batu Caves, Melawati and Putrajaya. The bus runs 4 trips daily per route, 2 morning trips to Putrajaya and 2 return evening trips. The buses consist of five specially modified King Long XMQ6121G, of which the transverse seatings were displaced from the former Mercedes Benz CBC1725 buses.

BET16 (previously known as E11A) – Warta Baru, Selayang – Presint 2 Putrajaya via Maju Expressway, Kuala Lumpur Middle Ring Road/Jalan Duta and Jalan Kuching
BET17 (previously known as E11B) – Hab Bas Pinggiran, Batu Caves – Hab Greenwood, Batu Caves – Presint 2 Putrajaya  via Sungai Besi Expressway and Kuala Lumpur Middle Ring Road 2

Penang express service 
 401E – Pengkalan Weld, Penang – Queensbay Mall – Bayan Baru – Bayan Lepas International Airport – Balik Pulau via Tun Dr. Lim Chong Eu Expressway (normal service as 401)

Discontinued 
Below were discontinued routes due to several reasons, such as ineffective route or low demand. This low demand were due to the MRT or LRT services already served the area.
BET1 – Kota Damansara, Petaling Jaya – Pasar Seni Terminal E via the Penchala Link (normal service as 780, discontinued due to MRT service)
BET2 – Bandar Sungai Long, Kajang – Lebuh Pudu bus hub via the Grand Saga Cheras–Kajang Expressway (normal service as 590, discontinued due to MRT service)
BET3 – Subang Mewah, USJ 1, Subang Jaya – Pasar Seni Terminal D via the New Pantai Expressway (normal service as 770, discontinued due to LRT service)
BET4 – Taman Sri Muda, Shah Alam – Pasar Seni D via the New Pantai Expressway (normal service as 751, discontinued due to low demand)
BET8 – Semenyih Sentral, Semenyih to Lebuh Pudu bus hub via the Kajang–Seremban Highway (discontinued due to low demand)

Bas Wanita – Bus for ladies only 
In early December 2010, RapidKL introduced the very first 'Bas Wanita services in Malaysia, which a bus will serve exclusively for ladies passengers only during morning and evening rush hours. Like KTM Komuter's Ladies Coach, this service is intended to avoid sexual harassment on the fully loaded normal buses during rush hours. 7 routes were put on trial with addition 8 routes after successful trial, with addition of letter prefix 'W' at the end of route number to distinguish with normal services (e.g. U6W, U80W). Special stickers and signage were placed to make the services more visible. This services were proved successful, but it was later discontinued due to bus shortage.

 RapidPenang Intercity 
On 2 August 2015, RapidPenang introduced the very first intercity route from Penang Sentral to Sungai Petani and Parit Buntar. This route uses Scania K250UB (previously Alexander Dennis Enviro500), and the frequency is one hour per bus.EB60 – Penang Sentral – Sungai Petani via North-South ExpresswayEB80 – Penang Sentral – Nibong Tebal and Parit Buntar via North-South Expressway

 Minibus trial 

In September 2019, Rapid KL re-introduced the minibus service to improve first-mile connectivity, especially for sharper and narrower routes. T300 is the first trial route to operate minibus service, using SKSBus E98 Midi-bodied Hino XZU high entry midibus leased from Kiffah Travel and Tours for 3 months. Later on 15 September 2019, another route, T304 were put on trial, using Pioneer-bodied Hino XZU high entry midibus leased from Selangor Omnibus for 3 months. One of the fleet were equipped with wheelchair hydraulic lift for wheelchair access.

On 20 October 2019, Rapid KL put another bus on trial using newly imported Hino Poncho minibus leased from Hino Motors Malaysia, which served the T784 service for 3 months. This bus later transferred to Batu Caves for another trial on T201 service.

On 16 November 2020, another trials were implemented, using 2 Toyota Hiace and 1 Hyundai Starex vans on newly-created route T252 for 4 months.

All leased fleets were returned after trials were ended, however on 11 October 2021, Rapid KL resumed the Hino Poncho minibus trials on 302 service, later expanded the trials to Rapid Penang on 15 October 2021 on route 11.

Bus Fleet
As of June 2014, the Rapid Bus fleet consists of 1,400 vehicles.

Double decker buses

Alexander Dennis Enviro500 MMC – 40 buses 
Volvo B8L Gemilang Body – 90 buses 

Single deck buses

 BYD K9 Gemilang body – 15 buses, exclusive for BRT 

 King Long XMQ6121G Intracoach body – 80 buses
 MAN 18.280 HOCL-NL (A84) Gemilang body – 150 buses 

 Volvo B7RLE Deftech body, refurbished by QBC Scomi – 120 buses
 Scania K250UB/K270UB Gemilang body – 830 buses  at Rapid KL, Rapid Penang, Rapid Kuantan and Rapid Kamunting
 Volvo B7RLE Gemilang body – 150 buses at MRT SBK Feeder Bus
 Scania K250UB Gemilang body – 150 buses at MRT SBK Feeder Bus

Toyota Hiace van – 1 van on RapidMobiliti taxi service in Penang
Hino Poncho minibus – 2 buses, one at Rapid KL, one at Rapid Penang (for Rapid KL, it's second time their use this bus for research trip with new interior size and livery after the first time it's come to Malaysia.Hino Poncho at least two or three company have tried after Rapid KL for first batch.)
Alexander Dennis Enviro200 – 80 buses (mothballing condition)
SKS SA-9 260L – 80 buses (mothballing condition)

 Decommissioned 

 MAN SL 252 (previously used by Intrakota from 1994, decommissioned in 2007)
 Iveco Turbocity 480 (previously used by Intrakota from 1994, decommissioned in 2012)
Mercedes Benz OH1318 (previously used by CityLiner Park May in the 90's, decommissioned in 2007)
 Dennis Dart (previously used by Putraline feeder bus in 1998, decommissioned in 2007)
 Dongfeng DHZ6120RC2 (decommissioned in 2019, part of RapidKL fleet were sold to Setara Jaya and Kiffah Travel and Tours)
 Anyuan JXK6120 (decommissioned in 2019)
 King Long XMQ6122 (decommissioned in 2017, part of the fleet were sold to Setara Jaya)
 Higer KLQ6118 (decommissioned in 2015, preserved by RapidMobiliti)
 Higer KLQ6121G (decommissioned in 2020)
 JAC (part of RapidPenang minibus fleet, decommissioned in 2010)
 Sheng Long (caught on fire in Melawati depot)
 Hino XZU (leased from Selangor Omnibus and Kiffah Travel and Tours, end of trial contract)
Mercedes-Benz CBC1725 Master Builders/SKS body (decommissioned in 2021, currently in mothballing condition)
Hyundai Starex MPV (end of trial contract)

Bus Depots
Rapid Bus headquarters complex were located at Cheras Selatan, where all training purposes, bus academy, new bus testing and major maintenance and overhaul takes place. It also holds as the largest depot than any other Rapid Bus depot. Other depots include Batu Caves, Shah Alam and Maluri depots for Rapid KL, Lorong Kulit, Mak Mandin and Pengkalan Weld depots for Rapid Penang, Nibong Tebal depot for RapidKamunting, and Semambu depots for Rapid Kuantan. Specially built BRT Sunway Line depot located at Sun U-Monash station, Sunway, while Sungai Buloh, Kajang and Jinjang depots houses the MRT Feeder buses.

See also

 Prasarana Malaysia Berhad
 Rapid Bus' Sdn Bhd
 Rapid KL
  BRT Sunway Line
 Rapid Penang
 Rapid Kuantan
 Land Public Transport Commission (SPAD)
 Public transport in Kuala Lumpur
 Buses in Kuala Lumpur
 List of bus routes in Kuala Lumpur

References

External links
 RapidKL Official Website

2006 establishments in Malaysia
Transport in the Klang Valley
Transport in Kuala Lumpur
Bus transport in Malaysia
Bus companies of Malaysia
Privately held companies of Malaysia
Malaysian companies established in 2006
Transport companies established in 2006